Archie Siswick (15 September 1894 – first ¼ 1964) was an English rugby union and professional rugby league footballer who played in the 1910s, 1920s and 1930s.

Background
Archie Siswick's birth was registered in Wakefield district, West Riding of Yorkshire, England, he was a Lance corporal in the Queen's Own Yorkshire Dragoons during the First World War, and his death aged 69 was registered in Leeds district, West Riding of Yorkshire, England.

Playing career

Rugby Union
Archie Siswick played rugby union for Wakefield RFC between 1911/12 and 1919/20. He was a centre and a press report stated that he had been elected club captain for the 1913/14 season, although later records do not back up this statement.

Rugby league
Archie Siswick turned professional with Wakefield Trinity during the 1919/20 season. His heritage number is 235. He went onto make 317 appearances and scoring 135 points, until his retirement during the 1929/30 season. He had been placed on the transfer list but decided to retire rather than join another club. The Wakefield Express described him as "one of the most enthusiastic and loyal players Trinity ever had."

Archie Siswick won cap(s) for Yorkshire (RL) while at Wakefield Trinity.

He played in Wakefield Trinity's 9–8 victory over Batley in the 1924–25 Yorkshire County Cup Final during the 1924–25 season at Headingley Stadium on Saturday 22 November 1924.

He played left-, i.e. number 4, in Wakefield Trinity's 3–29 defeat by Australia in the 1921–22 Kangaroo tour of Great Britain match at Belle Vue, Wakefield on Saturday 22 October 1921.

Archie Siswick's Testimonial match at Wakefield Trinity took place in 1930.

Archie Siswick made his début for Wakefield Trinity during August 1919, he appears to have scored no drop-goals (or field-goals as they are currently known in Australasia), but prior to the 1974–75 season all goals, whether; conversions, penalties, or drop-goals, scored 2-points, consequently prior to this date drop-goals were often not explicitly documented, therefore '0' drop-goals may indicate drop-goals not recorded, rather than no drop-goals scored. In addition, prior to the 1949–50 season, the archaic field-goal was also still a valid means of scoring points.

Genealogical information
Archie Siswick's baptism took place on 24 March 1895 in Sandal. Archie Siswick's marriage to Leah (née Hemingway) (birth registered fourth ¼ 1893 – death registered third ¼ 1961 (aged 67)) took place on 8 September 1921 in Wakefield district, the birth of their daughter Jean M. Siswick took place on 22 August 1923 in Wakefield district.

References

External links

Search for "Siswick" at rugbyleagueproject.org

1894 births
1964 deaths
British Army personnel of World War I
English rugby league players
English rugby union players
Queen's Own Yorkshire Dragoons soldiers
Rugby league centres
Rugby league fullbacks
Rugby league players from Wakefield
Rugby union players from Wakefield
Wakefield RFC players
Wakefield Trinity players
Yorkshire rugby league team players